Sir John Palmer, 5th Baronet  (1735– 11 February 1817) was a British politician who sat in the House of Commons from 1765 to 1780.

Palmer was the only surviving son of Sir Thomas Palmer, 4th Baronet, of Carlton and was baptised on 20 February 1735. He was educated at Leicester and was admitted at Emmanuel College, Cambridge in 1752.  He succeeded his father in the baronetcy on 14 June 1765. In 1776/1778 he commissioned John Johnson, a Leicester architect, to design a new hall at East Carlton, Northamptonshire on the foundations of a previous hall.

Palmer was elected Member of Parliament for Leicestershire in a by-election on 26 December 1765. He was returned again in 1768  and 1774. He did not stand in 1780.

Palmer died on 11 February 1817. He had married Charlotte Gough, daughter of Sir Henry Gough, 1st Baronet on 23 July 1768 and had 5 sons and 2 daughters. He was succeeded in turn by his sons Sir Thomas Palmer, 6th Baronet and Sir John Henry Palmer, 7th Baronet.

References

|-

1735 births
1817 deaths
Alumni of Emmanuel College, Cambridge
Members of the Parliament of Great Britain for Leicestershire
British MPs 1761–1768
British MPs 1768–1774
British MPs 1774–1780
Baronets in the Baronetage of England